Saint Kennocha (or Kennoch, Kennotha, Kevoca, Kyle, Enoch; died 1007) was a Scottish nun who is venerated as a saint in the area of Glasgow, Scotland.
She is remembered on 25 March.
She is included in the Book of Saints by the Monks of Ramsgate.

Dunbar's account

The hagiographer Agnes B. C. Dunbar wrote,

Butler's account

According to Alban Butler,

St Quivox

The name of the church and parish of St. Quivox in Ayrshire, Scotland, is thought to be a variant of Santa Kennocha Virgo in Coila, or Saint Kennocha.
Other forms of the name include St. Kevock, St Kenochis, St. Cavocks and St. Evox.  
However, The Oxford Dictionary of Saints says that the church of Quivox is named after Saint Kevoca, often thought to be Scottish, who was in fact the Irish saint Mo-Choemoc.

Notes

Sources

Female saints of medieval Scotland
1007 deaths